A helpline, or switchboard,  is a telephone service which offers help to those who call. Many helpline services now offer more than telephone support - offering access to information, advice or customer service via telephone, email, web or SMS. 
The word hotline is also sometimes used to refer to a helpline.
A helpline can provide emotional support to a person in distress in its minimalistic form. It may help the individual.

Services include:
 user assistance, for example computer software support 
 telephone counseling, medical hotlines, insolvency hotlines, crisis hotlines and many other types of hotlines.

See also

 Telephone counseling
 Hotline
 Single Non-Emergency Number
 Emergency telephone number

References

External links
Helpline Database

Information by telephone
Counseling